Sibi Division is a division of Balochistan province of Pakistan. It contains the following districts: The creation of Sibi Division in 1974, the divisional offices shifted to Ziarat during the summer.

Districts 
 Sibi District (created 1903)
 Kohlu District (1974)
 Dera Bugti District (1983)
 Ziarat District (1986)
 Harnai District (2007)
 Lehri District (Created 2013 and dissolved 2018)

Demographics 
According to 2017 census, Sibi division had a population of 963,941, which includes 506,028 males and 457,852 females. 
Sibi division constitutes 5,953 Hindus, 956,124 Muslims,1,456 Christians followed by 289 scheduled castes and 119 others.

References

Divisions of Balochistan